This is a list of football players who represented the Vietnam national football team in international football and were born outside Vietnam.

The following players:
 have played at least one game for the full (senior male) Vietnam international team; and
 were born outside Vietnam.

This list includes players who have dual citizenship with Vietnam and/or have become naturalized Vietnamese citizens. The players are ordered per modern-day country of birth; if the country at the time of birth differs from the current, this is indicated with a subsection.

Players

Naturalized players

Players with Vietnamese descent

Famous players
 Phan Văn Santos
 Huỳnh Kesley Alves
 Hoàng Vũ Samson
 Đinh Hoàng Max
 Đinh Hoàng La
 Hoàng Vissai
 Đỗ Merlo
 Nguyễn Thế Anh Lee
 Đặng Văn Lâm
 Filip Nguyễn
 Patrik Lê Giang
 Jason Quang Vinh Pendant
 Tristan Đỗ
 Yohan Cabaye
 Alexander Đặng
 Bùi Đức Duy
 Đỗ Chung Nguyên

References
General

 
 
 
 
 

Specific

 
Vietnam
Association football player non-biographical articles
Vietnam
Vietnamese diaspora
Vietnam